Berryville High School is a comprehensive public high school for students in grades 9 through 12 located in Berryville, Arkansas, United States. Berryville High School is the only high school of the Berryville School District and the largest of three public high schools in Carroll County.

Academics 
The assumed course of study follows the Smart Core curriculum developed by the Arkansas Department of Education (ADE), which requires students complete at least 22 units prior to graduation. Students complete regular coursework and exams and may take Advanced Placement (AP) courses and exam with the opportunity to receive college credit.

Athletics 
The high school emblem (mascot) of the Bobcat and colors of purple and gold have been shared by all schools in the district.

The Berryville Bobcats compete in interscholastic activities within the 4A Classification administered by the Arkansas Activities Association. The Bobcats play within the 4A Region 1 Conference. Berryville fields varsity teams in soccer (boys/girls) football, golf (boys/girls), basketball (boys/girls), cross country (boys/girls), cheer, bowling (boys/girls), baseball, fastpitch softball, track and field (boys/girls).

The Berryville Bobcats cross country teams are one of the state's most successful with 19 boys' state championships, including nine consecutive titles from 1971-80.  The girls' cross country teams have won seven girls' state championships between 1980 and 1992, including six consecutive titles (1997–2002).

Former football head coach Ron Clark won 211 games at Berryville between 1964 and 1994.

References

External links
 

Public high schools in Arkansas
Schools in Carroll County, Arkansas
Buildings and structures in Berryville, Arkansas